The 1956 Bucknell Bison football team was an American football team that represented Bucknell University as an independent during the 1956 NCAA College Division football season. 

In its 11th season under head coach Harry Lawrence, the team compiled a 3–5 record. Don Koppes and Ralph Riker were the team captains.

The team played its home games at Memorial Stadium on the university campus in Lewisburg, Pennsylvania.

Schedule

References

Bucknell
Bucknell Bison football seasons
Bucknell Bison football